Romain Weingarten (5 December 1926 – 13 July 2006) was a French playwright.

He was born in Paris, and grew up in Brittany and Château-Thierry. He studied philosophy at the Sorbonne, where he was strongly influenced by the work of Antonin Artaud, to whom he dedicated his first play, "Akara". Later though Weingarten rejected the label of "Theatre of the Absurd" sometimes attached to his work, and claimed an affiliation with the Surrealists and Roger Vitrac, preferring to describe his work as "poetic". In 1998, he received the Grand Prix du Théâtre de l’Académie française.

Weingarten died of old age, according to his family, at Challans, Vendée, and was buried in Mauron in Morbihan.

Bibliography
Akara (1948)
Les Nourrices (The Nurses) (1961)
L'Été (Summer) (1966)
Alice dans les jardins du Luxembourg (Alice in the Gardens of Luxembourg) (1970)
Comme la pierre (Like Stone) (1970, at the Comédie-Française)
La Mandore (Mandora) (1973)
Neige (Snow) (1979)
La Mort d’Auguste (The Death of Auguste) (1982).

This page is a translation of the French page.

Writers from Paris
1926 births
2006 deaths
University of Paris alumni
20th-century French dramatists and playwrights